Rural Committees are bodies representing the welfare of indigenous residents in the New Territories of Hong Kong.  The chairman of each rural committee is the representative in the Heung Yee Kuk, and is ex officio member of a district council.

Overview 
There are now 27 Rural Committees in total, thereby forming the Heung Yee Kuk. Rural Representative elections are held every four years, electing the village representatives and kaifong representatives of the Rural Committees. The composition of the Rural Committees are not statutorily regulated, even unelected villagers could become chairpersons of the Rural Committees.

List of Rural Committees

See also

 
 Rural Representative elections

References

Politics of Hong Kong